The discography of Japanese recording artist and actor Masaharu Fukuyama consists of ten studio albums, four compilation albums, three remix albums, twenty video albums, and numerous physical and promotional singles. Fukuyama debuted through BMG Japan by releasing the single "Tsuioku no Ame no Naka" (1990) and the album Dengon. The works failed to chart, however, in 1992 the single "Good Night", aided by the popularity it gained through use in the drama Ai wa Dō da, charted on the Oricon Singles Chart, peaking at number nine. In 1993, his album Calling became his first number one album on the Oricon Albums Chart; it has sold over 850,000 copies in Japan and has been certified two-times platinum by the Recording Industry Association of Japan (RIAJ).

His 1994 single "It's Only Love/Sorry Baby" became his first million-selling work in Japan. The parent album, On and On topped the album chart and was certified two-times platinum by the RIAJ. Following this, Fukuyama reduced the amount of recording he did and decided to concentrate on his acting career. After switching to Universal Music in 2000, Fukuyama released the single "Sakura Zaka", which sold over two million copies and was certified two-times million by the RIAJ. In 2003, the triple A-side single "Niji/Himawari/Sore ga Subete sa" topped the Oricon Single Chart for five weeks and was certified million by the RIAJ. The studio album featuring the single, 5 Nen Mono, was released in 2006.

Fukuyama acted in the TV drama Galileo in 2007 and formed a band Koh+ with his co-actor in the series Kō Shibasaki. The band released two gold-certified singles "Kiss Shite" and "Saiai" in 2007 and 2008 respectively. Fukuyama also contributed to the series' soundtrack. The singer released two more studio albums, Zankyō (2009) and Human (2014), both of which topped the Oricon Albums Chart.

Albums

Studio albums

Compilation albums

Cover albums

Live albums

Remix albums

Soundtrack albums

Singles

As lead artist

Promotional singles

Other charted songs

As featured artist

Other appearances

Videography

Video albums

Notes

References

Pop music discographies
Rock music discographies
Discographies of Japanese artists